Sai Yok may refer to:
Sai Yok district, Kanchanaburi Province, Thailand
Sai Yok National Park
Sai Yok Noi Waterfall
Sai Yok Yai waterfall
Sai Yok rock shelter, an archaeological site